Anthony Michael Gerard Rota  (born May 15, 1961) is a Canadian politician who is the 37th and current speaker of the House of Commons of Canada since 2019. A member of the Liberal Party, he currently serves as the member of Parliament (MP) for the riding of Nipissing—Timiskaming. He previously represented Nipissing—Timiskaming as MP from 2004 to 2011. In 2019, he was elected by the House of Commons to be the speaker in the 43rd Parliament and in 2021 was re-elected in the 44th Parliament.

Early life and career
Born in North Bay, Ontario, Rota holds a Bachelor of Arts in political science from Wilfrid Laurier University, a diploma in finance from Algonquin College and a Master of Business Administration degree from the University of Ottawa.

Prior to his election, Rota worked for the Industrial Research Assistance Program (IRAP) as regional manager for Ontario. He has also served with the Canadian Technology Network in Ottawa and has worked in the private sector. Rota is fluent in English, French, Italian and Spanish. He is a political science sessional lecturer at Nipissing University.

Political career
Rota began his political career at the municipal level, serving as a city councillor for North Bay City Council and chairing the city's planning and economic development committee. He won the federal Liberal nomination for Nipissing—Timiskaming in early 2004, defeating rival candidates Susan Church, Hugh McLachlan and Joe Sinicrope with 52% on the second ballot. In the general election held in June of that year, he narrowly defeated Conservative candidate Al McDonald.

Rota was re-elected in the 2006 election, defeating the Conservative Party's Peter Chirico, the NDP's Dave Fluri, and the Green Party's Meg Purdy. In the 2008 election, he was again re-elected. He served as the Liberal Party caucus chair, and as critic for the Federal Economic Development Initiative for Northern Ontario.

He ran again in the 2011 election but lost by just 14 votes to Jay Aspin of the Conservative Party. Due to the narrow margin, however, an automatic judicial recount was required, confirming the margin at 18 votes. After his 2011 loss, Rota began teaching at Nipissing University in North Bay, Ontario.

In the 2015 election, he was again the Liberal candidate, defeating Aspin and once again becoming the MP in the 42nd Canadian Parliament. On December 9, 2015, he was appointed Assistant Deputy Chair of Committees of the Whole.

Rota was re-elected in the 2019 election. He was also elected as 37th speaker of the House of Commons on December 5, 2019, by winning a ranked ballot between himself, Joël Godin, Carol Hughes, Geoff Regan (the speaker during the previous Parliament) and Bruce Stanton. Following Rota's win, the Conservatives said that he had them to thank for his new position. They had made the decision to unseat Regan as a show of strength during a caucus meeting. They did so by ranking Regan further down on the ranked ballot.

On June 17, 2020, Rota ordered that NDP Leader Jagmeet Singh be removed from the House of Commons after referring to Bloc Québécois MP Alain Therrien as a racist.

On November 22, 2021, Rota was re-elected as the speaker of the House of Commons.

Electoral record

Arms

References

External links
 View Anthony Rota
 

1961 births
Canadian people of Italian descent
Liberal Party of Canada MPs
Living people
Members of the House of Commons of Canada from Ontario
North Bay, Ontario city councillors
Algonquin College alumni
University of Ottawa alumni
Wilfrid Laurier University alumni
21st-century Canadian politicians
Speakers of the House of Commons of Canada